The following is a list of Fangoria Chainsaw Award winners for Best Actor.  It is awarded annually to an actor for his work in a horror or thriller film.

Winners and nominees

1990s

2000s

2010s

2020s

References

External links
 Website

A
Film awards for lead actor